Itherther is a deity in the mythology of the Kabyle people of Algeria. According to legend, Itherther was a buffalo who existed at the beginning of time, alone with a female calf called Thamuatz. Itherther and Thamuatz had come from a dark place beneath the earth called Tlam. They preferred the light of the earth to the darkness of Tlam and decided to stay. Itherther and Thamuatz had a son called Achimi, and a daughter. Achimi mated with his mother and sister and when Itherther found out, he fought with his son. Defeated, Itherther ran away. In time, with his semen, he created seven new species of animal.

References

External links
Itherther at godchecker.com

African gods
Creator gods